Mansour Aghaei (born August 4, 1987 in Tabriz, Iran) is an Iranian professional rock climber, specializing in lead climbing and bouldering who is currently in charge of the Iran national climbing team. He also has been teaching physical education in the University of Tabriz since 2012. In 2002 Aghaei came second in Asian Youth Championships in Malaysia.

Biography 
Aghaei started climbing at the age of six and has been climbing for 25 years; his brother is a climber and shared his passion with him and helped him to pass various climbing courses. At age of nine, he won gold medal in Tabriz province championships and in 2002 at the age of fifteen came second in Asian Youth Championships in Malaysia and was honored and awarded by president of Iran as one of the best Champions in Iran and best athlete of the province.

He was ranked second in the National Biology Olympiad of Iran in 2004 and was eager to study and research in the field of rock climbing and continued his academic education in Physical Education (09.2006 - 01.2009), Exercise Physiology (09.2009 - 07.2011) and Metabolism & Exercise Biochemistry (09.2015 - 07.2018) in University of Tabriz. He graduated B.Sc. and M.Sc. as top student and got best paper award in first Eurasian Sport Science Congress which was held in University of Tabriz, 2018 (Effects of one month rock climbing training with or without blood flow restriction on vascular endothelial growth factor and growth hormone in elite climbers).

Positions 
Here are some positions he has held:
 2012 – Tabriz Mountaineering and Sport climbing–Educational Consultant
 2013 – Tabriz Mountaineering and Sport climbing–Educational Consultant
 2014 – Tabriz Mountaineering and Sport climbing–Educational Consultant
 2015 – Tabriz Mountaineering and Sport climbing–Educational Consultant
 2016 – Tabriz Mountaineering and Sport climbing–Educational Consultant
 2017 – Tabriz Mountaineering and Sport climbing–Educational Consultant
 2018 – Tabriz Mountaineering and Sport climbing–Educational Consultant
 2018 – Tabriz Mountaineering and Sport climbing–Sport Climbing Committee–Route Setting Director
 2018 – Iran Mountaineering and Sport Climbing Federation–Fitness Trainer of National Climbing Team

Coaching

Coaching certificates
 IRI Sport Climbing and Mountaineering Federation – Sport Climbing Coach Grade 3
 IRI Sport Climbing and Mountaineering Federation – Sport Climbing Coach Grade 2
 IRI Ping Pong Federation – Ping Pong Coach Grade 3
 Fitness Coach Grade 3

Coaching experience

Route Setting

Route Setting certificates 
 IRI Sport Climbing and Mountaineering Federation – Sport Climbing Route Setter Level 3

National Team memberships 
 Junior National Team
 2002 – Malaysia, Asian Youth Championships
 National Team
 2004 – China, Asian Championships

Rankings

Asian Youth Championships

National Championships

Tabriz International Climbing Competitions

Baku International Climbing Competitions

East Azerbaijan Province Championships

References 

1987 births
Living people
Iranian rock climbers
Sportspeople from Tabriz